Eduardo Julve Ciriaco (27 August 1923 – 2008) was a Peruvian discus thrower. He was born in Chincha Alta. He competed at the 1948 Summer Olympics in London, where he placed 12th in the discus final. He also competed in decathlon. Julve died in 2008.

References

1923 births
2008 deaths
Athletes (track and field) at the 1948 Summer Olympics
Olympic athletes of Peru
People from Ica Region
Peruvian male discus throwers